This is a list of prisons within Sichuan province of the People's Republic of China.

Sources 

Buildings and structures in Sichuan
Sichuan